Fighting fish may refer to:

Fish
 Javanese fighting fish (Betta picta)
 Mekong fighting fish (Betta smaragdina)
 Siamese fighting fish (Betta splendens)
 Betta mahachaiensis
 Penang betta (Betta pugnax)

Other uses
 Fighting Fish, a 2004 film choreographed by Ron Smoorenburg 
 "Fighting Fish", a song by Dessa from the 2013 album Parts of Speech
 "Japanese fighting fish", a sketch in the British-Canadian animated television series Planet Sketch
 Siamese Fighting Fish (band) or Siamese, a Danish rock and metal band
 Nickname of the Thai professional Association football club Chachoengsao Hi-Tek F.C.